Thomas Bayard may refer to:

Thomas F. Bayard (1828–1898), politician from U.S. state of Delaware and U.S. Secretary of State
Thomas F. Bayard (pilot boat)
Thomas F. Bayard Jr. (1868–1942), politician from U.S. state of Delaware

See also
Bayard family